The Karlsruhe model is a tram-train system which consists of tram/light rail trains and commuter/regional rail trains running on the same set of tracks, generally between or outside of urban areas. It was initially developed and implemented in the city of Karlsruhe, Germany by the local transit authority, Karlsruher Verkehrsverbund (KVV).

Overview

Commencing service in 1992, the system in Karlsruhe has provided a connection between the regular railway network and the city's local tram network. The whole system is now called the Karlsruhe Stadtbahn. Passengers may travel from distant towns such as Baden-Baden directly into the city centre of Karlsruhe, bridging the inconvenient distance between the main station and the city centre. For most trips, the number of train transfers has been reduced significantly.

This model has led to the creation of similar tram-train systems in other locations.

Other examples

A similar model has been connecting the city of Vienna with the Baden suburb since 1886 as Lokalbahn Wien-Baden. Other systems that have implemented the Karlsruhe model include:
 City-Bahn Chemnitz, Germany
 Saarbahn, Germany
 Kassel RegioTram, Germany
 Nordhausen tramway network, Germany
 Tyne and Wear Metro, United Kingdom
 RijnGouweLijn, Netherlands
 RandstadRail, Netherlands
 Athens Metro, Greece
 San Diego Trolley, United States
 Alicante Tram, Spain
 Sheffield Supertram, United Kingdom 

In 2013, Adelaide Metro in Australia proposed the PortLINK project, which would have featured the Karlsruhe model for 4.8 km of track between Bowden and Woodville, followed by another 4.2 km to Port Adelaide.

Train-trams

Zwickau, Germany has reversed the Karlsruhe model by extending Lightweight RegioSprinter diesel trains from the main-line railway onto the street tramway as train-trams (Zwickau Model).

See also
Tram-train
Karlsruhe Stadtbahn
Stadtbahn

References

External links
 Karlsruhe model project includes extensive information on the history of Karlsruhe's Stadtbahn with a special focus on the development of the model
 Karlsruhe Transport Authority (KVV) KVV operates rail service in the Karlsruhe region that runs as a fast train and flexibly as a tram in the city.
 Karlsruhe: The Karlsruhe model of a dual-mode railway system from SURBAN – database on sustainable urban development in Europe by the European Academy of the Urban Environment, Berlin

Passenger rail transport in Germany
Rail transport operations
Rail transport in Karlsruhe
Transportation planning